Sangau is a larger village in Lawngtlai district of Mizoram state of India. Sangau, being close to India–Myanmar border, provides opportunities for trade through the border haat here. Nearby Phawngpui (lit. Blue Mountains) is a major tourist attraction.

Demography 

The Sangau village has population of 1272 of which 636 are males while 636 are females as per Population Census 2011. Today, more than 1000 families household residing. In Sangau village population of children with age 0-6 is 282 which makes up 22.17 % of total population of village. Average Sex Ratio of Sangau village is 1000 which is higher than Mizoram state average of 976. Child Sex Ratio for the Sangau as per census is 1000, higher than Mizoram average of 970. Sangau village has lower literacy rate compared to Mizoram. In 2011, literacy rate of Sangau village was 82.93 % compared to 91.33 % of Mizoram. In Sangau Male literacy stands at 85.45 % while female literacy rate was 80.40 %.

Since people of this area are considered one of the lost tribes of Israel, thousands of residents have migrated to Israel.

Administration 

Sangau is a sub-divisional headquarters and  rural development block within Lawngtlai district in Mizoram. The main officers within Sangau are:

1. Sub-Divisional Officer (Civil) or SDO (C)

2. Block Development Officer (BDO)

3. Revenue Officer (RO), LADC

4. Junior Engineer (JE), P&E Dept. 

5. Circle Officer (CO), Horticulture Dept. 

6. Range Officer (RO), Environment & Forest Dept., Mizoram

7. Range Officer (RO), Environment & Forest Dept., LADC

8. Officer In-charge (OC), Mizoram police

Economy

Agriculture 

The main occupation of the people of Sangau is agriculture (the backbone of its economy) having rice as its staple food. Other crops like ginger, sesame, banana, chili, tilt, pine-apple, orange, mango, etc. are also cultivated.

Border Haat and trade 

Sangau (Pangkhua) is one of the 4 Border Haats (markets) in Mizoram, others being at Hnahlan, Vaphai (Saikhumphai) and Zote, all of whichboost the local trade and economy.

Transport and connectivity 

Lengpui Airport in Aizawl (255 km northwest) is the nearest airport in India. Sairang railhead of Bairabi–Sairang line 243 km north is the nearest railway station. NH-2 is accessible via Lunglei 110 km northwest and Siaha 80 km southwest.

See also 

 Borders of India

References

Cities and towns in Saiha district